"All I Want" is a song by American punk rock group the Offspring. It is the tenth track on their fourth studio album, Ixnay on the Hombre (1997), and was released as its lead single in January 1997. It reached No. 31 in the United Kingdom and No. 15 in Australia. In the US, it peaked at No. 13 on Modern Rock Tracks. The song also appears as the fifth track on their Greatest Hits (2005). The single was also (at 1:55) the shortest single to be released by the band.

Track listing

CD single

Europe 7" green vinyl

Promo CD

Origin
The song was written by Dexter Holland as part of a (perhaps tongue-in-cheek) Bad Religion songwriting competition at Epitaph Records, under the title Protocol. The song's lyrics originally consisted of significantly complex vocabulary, like many Bad Religion songs. However, when Dexter offered to play it for Epitaph owner and Bad Religion guitarist Brett Gurewitz, he was told to "play it on acoustic later or something." Dexter felt rejected and rewrote the song's lyrics to sound more like an Offspring song.

Music video
The band made a video for the song, which was directed by David Yow of the Jesus Lizard.

The video consisted of shots of the band playing and singing the song mixed with a teenage boy seemingly running away from home, while the band is shown the video is often in psychedelic colors. The boy takes his clothes off down to his boxers while running through his town. At the end of the video he arrives in a park, and falls in a puddle of mud. In between the shots of the band and the shots of the running boy are old, black and white video clips from various situations, including a bicycle race, an airplane crashing into a barn, and a race car ploughing into a crowd.

As confirmed on the Complete Music Video Collection DVD, Buzz Osborne is the man wearing the mask while playing the piano.

DVD appearances
The music video also appears on the Complete Music Video Collection DVD. It was released in 2005.

Charts

Appearances in medias
This song was featured in the 1999 arcade game, and video game Crazy Taxi as well as third installment Crazy Taxi 3, computer game Jugular Street Luge Racing, and was also added to Wargaming in World of Tanks during October of 2019.
 Was available as downloadable content in the Rock Band video game series.
Was featured in a season one episode of the MTV animated series Daria entitled "College Bored".
Done by DDT wrestler Toui Kojima as his entrance theme since 2021.

References

External links
 

The Offspring songs
1997 singles
Songs written by Dexter Holland
Skate punk songs
Columbia Records singles
Epitaph Records singles
1997 songs